Rich Isaacson is an international music entrepreneur whose influence spans artists such as Wu-Tang Clan, MIKA, Akon, Gustavo Santaolalla, Charles Bradley, Mobb Deep, Melanie Fiona, SafetySuit, and Three 6 Mafia.

Background 
Isaacson was born in Brooklyn and raised in Merrick, Long Island. His father was a toy manufacturer and his mother worked as a medical office professional. 
He attended Cornell University’s College of Labor Relations, where he studied the union movement and labor history. After attending the University of Pennsylvania Law School, Isaacson joined the Manhattan law firm of Shea and Gould. After several years at Shea and Gould, he quit to join his childhood friend Steve Rifkind in a music production and distribution partnership in Los Angeles, California.

Loud Records 
In the early '90s, Rifkind’s LOUD Records had secured a small production deal with Zoo Records, at the same time running SRC, an upstart street promotion/marketing company designed to connect the dots in the emerging Rap scene. Isaacson spent a few weeks on Rifkind’s couch, studying Billboard, reading lawyer Don Passman’s "All You Need to Know About the Music Business" and going over the LOUD contracts. He soon took over day to day operations at the fledgling start-up.

Together, the pair built LOUD Records from a $3,000-a-month production deal to a $100 million joint-venture label, featuring multi-platinum artists such as Wu-Tang Clan, Mobb Deep, Big Pun, Xzibit, Funkmaster Flex and Three6Mafia. Rich led the negotiation for LOUD’s landmark deal, signing Wu-Tang Clan for $10,000. LOUD released the single, "Protect Ya Neck," with the promise to allow leader RZA to shop the other members of the collective to individual solo deals at other labels, then an unprecedented concession in recording contracts. This deal proved dynamic in LOUD'S trajectory as Wu-Tang's success catapulted LOUD to the forefront of the music industry.

LOUD's roster, has been regarded as one of the most iconic in hip-hop history, as its catalogue released a number of seminal Hip-Hop albums including Wu-Tang Clan's Enter the Wu-Tang (36 Chambers) and Wu-Tang Forever; Mobb Deep's The Infamous, Hell on Earth, and Murda Muzik; Raekwon Da Chef's Only Built 4 Cuban Linx...; Xzibit's At the Speed of Life and Restless; Big Pun's Capital Punishment; The Alkaholiks's 21 & Over, Coast II Coast, and Likwidation; Dead Prez's Let's Get Free; M.O.P.'s Warriorz; Funkmaster Flex's 60 Minutes of Funk Volumes 1, 2, and 3; and Three 6 Mafia's When the Smoke Clears: Sixty 6, Sixty 1.

Isaacson also oversaw the expansion of SRC's "Street Team" concept, a group of 25 tastemakers around the country who marketed underground non-commercial records at the grassroots level.  SRC's marketing prowess eventually attracted Fortune 500 companies like Nike, Pepsi, Levi’s, Universal Pictures and Hugo Boss. LOUD and SRC ultimately forged a first-look deal with Miramax Films and the acquisition of SRC by advertising conglomerate Interpublic.

Isaacson's run at LOUD ended with the acquisition of the entire company by Sony in 2002 after LOUD merged with Sony's wholly owned Relativity label.

The Fuerte Group 
After his success with LOUD, Isaacson partnered with Sony Music executive Jerry Blair on The Fuerte Group in 2002, an innovative, full-service marketing and music management company dedicated to the burgeoning young Hispanic urban market. At Fuerte, Isaacson served as executive producer on Motown Remixed Volume 2, a compilation of that legendary label’s hits covered by leading Latin Producers and the critically acclaimed Si*se album More Shine released on their own Fuerte Records.

Mirroring his Street Team concept at LOUD, Fuerte attracted corporate clients including Coca-Cola, Western Union, Hollywood Records, J Records, the WWE, SRC Records, Latino Royalty, The Mottola Company, Blingtones, Universal Music Group, Tu Pizza, Heineken, Clear Channel, Major League Soccer, Koch Entertainment and Univision. Through Fuerte management client, Grammy-winning writer/producer Jodi Marr (Ricky Martin, Paulina Rubio, Thalia), Isaacson met and signed his first artist management client—U.K.-based performer Mika, who went on to sell over 10 million albums, going gold or platinum in 32 countries.

Street Records Corporation 
After Fuerte Music Group, Isaacson reunited with Rifkind at the newly launched SRC label at Universal Records, which operated for five years and produced another flurry of hit artists, including David Banner, Akon, Shontelle, Grammy winner Melanie Fiona and Asher Roth, ending only when the company was sold to Universal Music Group in 2012.

RI Entertainment 
RI Entertainment is Isaacson's management project, shifting his focus to management with an array of artists including international superstar Mika, two-time Oscar-winning composer Gustavo Santaolalla (Brokeback Mountain, Babel), his Grammy-winning Electro-Rock Tango collective Bajofondo, Canada’s highest selling native artist Bobby Bazini, and soul singer Charles Bradley.

Def Jam Recordings 
In early 2018, Isaacson was hired by Paul Rosenberg for the EVP/GM position of Def Jam Recordings. Isaacson was the first major hire under new Def Jam CEO Paul Rosenberg, who started last November at the Universal Music subsidiary. Def Jam is home to the releases of various record labels, including Kanye West's GOOD Music,[1][2] and ARTium Recordings, headed by Def Jam's former executive vice president. Current artists include Alessia Cara, Logic, Big Sean, Kanye West, 2 Chainz, Jeezy, Jeremih,  Pusha T, Vince Staples, Desiigner and Jhené Aiko among others. Isaacson separated from Def Jam in May, 2021 following the departure of Paul Rosenberg in February of 2020.

References

1964 births
Living people
Cornell University School of Industrial and Labor Relations alumni
University of Pennsylvania Law School alumni
People from Merrick, New York